The Aspropyrgos Refinery is an oil refining complex located near Aspropyrgos, a suburb of Athens, in Greece. It is operated by Hellenic Petroleum. The refinery has a nominal annual refining capacity of 7.5 million tons.

Equipment
The unit processes  atmospheric residue and vacuum gas oil of the Aspropyrgos and Thessaloniki refineries, to produce higher value products.

With the upgrade of the naphtha hydrodesulfurization and reforming units and with the operation of the TAME unit, the refinery is in a position to produce high octane gasoline with strict environmental specifications (10 ppm S) which supplies to the entire market and covers 80% of the total group production in gasoline products. With the upgrade of the diesel desulphurization unit and the distribution network, it is in a position to produce auto diesel (of 50 and 10 ppm S).

The Aspropyrgos refinery owns a large private harbour, has modern oil tanker and rail terminals, an extensive crude oil distribution pipeline network from Pachi – Megara, and a distribution pipeline for finished and semi-finished products from and to the Elefsina refinery. It is also connected, through a fuel pipeline, to the Eleftherios Venizelos Athens International Airport, having the main responsibility for fuel supply.

See also

 Corinth Refinery

External links
Official Hellenic Petroleum Site
www.images-words.com

Oil refineries in Greece
West Attica